Dactyloscopus foraminosus, the reticulate stargazer, is a species of sand stargazer native to the coastal waters of  Brazil where it can be found at depths of from .  This species may also occur off the coast of Florida, United States.  It can reach a maximum length of  NG.

References

foraminosus
Fish described in 1982
Taxa named by Charles Eric Dawson